After Jimmy is a 1996 American made-for-television drama film based on a true story starring Meredith Baxter as a woman, with her family, mourning the suicide death of her teenage son. As of 2008, the film has not been released on video or DVD.

Premise
Depressed eighteen-year-old Jimmy Stapp commits suicide by shooting himself in the head with his father's gun. His family (mother Maggie, father Sam, and two young siblings Billy and Rosie) struggles to deal with life, amid questions of why they didn't see the signs sooner and what could have precipitated suicide. Both parents grieve very differently in the aftermath, which divides them as they search for a way to bring their family back together.

Cast
Meredith Baxter as Margaret "Maggie" Stapp
Bruce Davison as Ward "Sam" Stapp
Peter Facinelli as James "Jimmy" Stapp
Mae Whitman as Rosanna "Rosie" Stapp
Ryan Slater as William "Billy" Stapp
Eva Marie Saint as Liz
Natalia Nogulich as Lydia
Deborah May as Karen
Željko Ivanek as Dr. Darren Walters
Tina Lifford as Susan Johnson
Scott Michael Campbell as Matt
Raye Birk as John Davies
Dean Norris as Ray Johnson
Jeanne Mori as Jane
Deborah May as Karen
Aaron Lustig as Mike

External links

1996 television films
1996 drama films
1996 films
1990s English-language films
CBS network films
American films based on actual events
Films about suicide
Films directed by Glenn Jordan